Shōga (生姜) is the Japanese word for ginger and can refer to:

Gari (ginger), also called sushi ginger
Beni shōga, a type of Japanese pickle
Pork shogayaki, a Japanese dish with sliced pork and ginger

See also:
Kuchi shōga, a Japanese phonetic system for 'pronouncing' the sounds of drums
Shogaol, a chemical found in ginger